Tsuruzo Ishii (5 June 1887 – 17 March 1973) was a Japanese painter. His work was part of the painting event in the art competition at the 1936 Summer Olympics.

References

1887 births
1973 deaths
20th-century Japanese painters
Japanese painters
Olympic competitors in art competitions
People from Tokyo